Bassein may refer to: vasai

India
 Vasai, a city in Maharashtra state, India; known as Bassein during Portuguese rule
 Treaty of Bassein (1534)
 Treaty of Bassein (1802)
 Military history of Bassein
 Bassein Fort, a colonial fort in Vasai built by the Portuguese
 , Indian Navy ship; formerly known as HMS Littleham (M2707)
 Battle of Bassein, part of Maratha Portuguese war; also known as Battle of Vasai

Myanmar (Burma)
 Pathein, the capital city of Ayeyarwady Division, Myanmar; formerly known as Bassein
 Pathein Airport, airport in Pathein, Myanmar; formerly known as Bassein Airport
 Roman Catholic Diocese of Pathein, formerly known as Roman Catholic Diocese of Bassein
 Uzana of Bassein, heir-presumptive of the throne of the Kingdom of Pagan
 Pathein Township, township in Myanmar; formerly known as Bassein West Township
 Pathein River, a distributary of the Yangon River in Burma; formerly known as Bassein River

See also
 Bassin (disambiguation)